Hans Richard Curjel (1 May 1896 in Karlsruhe, Germany - 3 January 1974 in Zürich, Switzerland) was a Swiss art historian, conductor and theatre director.

Education 
Curjel attended Humboldt School in Berlin and studied music before changing to art history at the University of Freiburg, the University of Vienna, and the Humboldt University of Berlin.

Art and theatre 
From 1925, he held the position as director of the Staatliche Kunsthalle Karlsruhe. In 1927, he took over from Otto Klemperer as conductor and director at the Kroll Opera House until it closed in 1931. He was a close friend of  artist Arnold Bode. Until 1933, Curjel acted as the guest director of the Deutsche Oper Berlin.

Emigration to Switzerland 
In 1933, Curjel emigrated to Switzerland to avoid persecution by the Nazis because of his Jewish faith. From 1942 to 1949 he was director of the Zurich Theatre and Touring Cooperative.

Later career 
From 1948, Curjel worked as a freelance director in Berlin, Paris, Rome and Zurich. At the 1949 Salzburg Festival, he directed Mozart's La clemenza di Tito. In the Federal Republic of Germany, he produced several radio programmes on new music, most often for West German Radio.

Family 
Curjel was born to upper middle class Jewish parents, Robert Curjel and Marie Curjel (née Hermann). His sister Gertrud was murdered in the Auschwitz concentration camp in February 1943.

References 

1896 births
1974 deaths
Swiss art historians
Swiss theatre directors
Swiss theatre people
Swiss composers
Swiss conductors (music)
Jewish emigrants from Nazi Germany to Switzerland
University of Freiburg alumni
University of Vienna alumni
Humboldt University of Berlin alumni